The netX network controller family (based on ASICs), developed by Hilscher Gesellschaft für Systemautomation mbH, is a solution for implementing all proven Fieldbus and Real-Time Ethernet systems. It was the first Multi-Protocol ASIC which combines Real-Time-Ethernet and Fieldbus System in one solution. The Multiprotocol functionality is done over a flexible cpu sub system called XC. Through exchanging some microcode the XC is able to realize beside others a PROFINET IRT Switch, EtherCAT Slave, Ethernet Powerlink HUB, PROFIBUS, CAN bus, CC-Link Industrial Networks Interface.

The Hilscher netX family

Multiplex Matrix IOs (MMIO) 
The Multiplex Matrix is a set of PINs which could be configured freely with peripheral functions. Options are CAN, UART, SPI, I2C, GPIOs**, PIOs and SYNC Trigger.

GPIOs 
The GPIOs from Hilscher are able to generate Interrupts, could count level or flags, or could be connected to a timer unit to auto generate a PWM. The Resolution of the PWM is normally 10ns. In some netX ASICS is a dedicated Motion unit with a resolution if 1ns is available.

References

External links 
 Hilscher homepage
 ASICS

Industrial automation
Computer networks
Industrial Ethernet
Industrial computing
CAN bus